Terminalia platyphylla, commonly known as wild plum, is a tree of the family Combretaceae native to northern Australia.

It blooms between January and October producing white-cream flowers.

It is found along creeks in the Kimberley region of Western Australia growing in sandy soils.

References

platyphylla
Trees of Australia
Flora of the Northern Territory
Rosids of Western Australia
Plants described in 1861
Taxa named by Ferdinand von Mueller